In mathematical morphology, the closing  of a set (binary image) A by a structuring element B is the erosion of the dilation of that set,

where  and  denote the dilation and erosion, respectively. 

In image processing, closing is, together with opening, the basic workhorse of morphological noise removal. Opening removes small objects, while closing removes small holes.

Properties
 It is idempotent, that is, .
 It is increasing, that is, if , then .
 It is extensive, i.e., .
 It is translation invariant.

See also
Mathematical morphology
Dilation
Erosion
Opening
Top-hat transformation

Bibliography
 Image Analysis and Mathematical Morphology by Jean Serra,  (1982)
 Image Analysis and Mathematical Morphology, Volume 2: Theoretical Advances by Jean Serra,  (1988)
 An Introduction to Morphological Image Processing by Edward R. Dougherty,  (1992)

External links
 Introduction to mathematical morphology

Mathematical morphology
Digital geometry